Riot! Entertainment is an independent record label, music distribution service and tour promoter based in Wollongong, Australia. According to their website, Riot is Australia's biggest heavy metal music distribution company. The company serves as the Australian distributor for Nuclear Blast, Metal Blade, Relapse, Season of Mist, Victory Records, Peaceville Records, Good Fight Records and several others. Riot is also a record label with a roster that currently includes Hellyeah, Black Label Society, Ace Frehley, Stuck Mojo, Mortal Sin, The Poor, LORD, and Voyager among others.

Current roster
* denotes Australia/New Zealand distribution only

 Hellyeah*
 Black Label Society*
 Ace Frehley*
 Stuck Mojo
 Yngwie Malmsteen*
 Free Reign
 Annihilator*
 The Poor
 Mortal Sin
 Melody Black
 Voyager
 LORD
 Vanishing Point
 Universum
 Ink
Skintilla*
 Our Last Enemy*

Former artists
 Fozzy
 Buried in Verona
 Five Star Prison Cell
 Aiden
 The Berzerker
 Black Asylum

Australian record labels
Australian independent record labels
Companies based in New South Wales
Heavy metal record labels